The 1969 Milan–San Remo was the 60th edition of the Milan–San Remo cycle race and was held on 19 March 1969. The race started in Milan and finished in San Remo. The race was won by Eddy Merckx of the Faema team.

General classification

References

1969
1969 in road cycling
1969 in Italian sport
1969 Super Prestige Pernod